Corso is an unincorporated community in western Lincoln County, Missouri, United States. It is located on Missouri Supplemental Route PP, approximately fourteen miles northwest of Troy.

A post office called Corso was established in 1873, and remained in operation until 1980. It is unclear why the name Corso was applied to this community.

References

Unincorporated communities in Lincoln County, Missouri
Unincorporated communities in Missouri